Marko Atlagić (born 30 April 1949) is a Croatian-born, Serbian historian and politician. He is one of the leaders of the Serbian Progressive Party (SNS) and Head of the Historical Department at the Faculty of Philosophy at the University of Priština in North Mitrovica, with auxiliary historical sciences as his preferred field.

Early life and education
Born in Benkovac, PR Croatia, FRP Yugoslavia, Atlagić finished primary school and grammar school in hometown. He later graduated from the Faculty of Philology at the University of Zadar. At the Faculty of Philosophy of the University in Zadar, Atlagić had received his PhD in Heraldry, studying heraldic elements in Medieval Croatia.

Activism and politics
In the early 1990s, he has joined the Serb nationalist movement in Croatia, seeking to separate from Croatia, after country proclaimed independence from SFRJ. In 1991 he participated pan-Serbian meeting of the SAO Kninska Krajina in Knin as one of the speakers. As a member of ultra-nationalist the "Serbian Radical Party for Republic of Srpska Krajina" (SRS for RSK) he was elected MP in the Parliament of the Republic of Serbian Krajina, and in 1994 elected its vice-president after the Serbian Radical Party dominated parliamentary majority was constituted. The government fell in late 1994, after which Atlagic resigned from the position of Deputy Speaker.

In 1995, Atlagić was Minister without portfolio in the last RSK government, under Milan Babić. After Operation Storm, he had been one of the ministers from 1995 to 2006 by the SRS-promoted Government of the RSK in Exile. In 2007, the SRS had crumbled and Marko Atlagić had supported the Tomislav Nikolić fraction as opposed to Vojislav Šešelj, becoming a member of the new Serbian Progressive Party's Presidency and assigned for Refugee and IDP problems.

In 2006, Atlagić testified at the trial of Slobodan Milošević.

Works 
 Grbovi plemstva u Slavoniji: 1700-1918, 1982.
 Razvitak heraldike u Srbiji, Priština 1997.
 Pomoćne istorijske nauke, Priština 1997.
 Istorijska geografija, Beograd 2001.
 Istorijska geografija, Beograd 2005.
 Pomoćne istorijske nauke u teoriji i praksi, Beograd 2007.
 Srpsko plemstvo i grbovi u Dubrovniku, Dalmaciji, Hrvatskoj i Slavoniji, Beograd 2009.

References

1949 births
Living people
20th-century Serbian historians
Serbian nationalists
Serbian heraldry
Serbs of Croatia
Members of the Assembly of the Republic of Serbian Krajina
Members of the National Assembly (Serbia)
Serbian Radical Party politicians
Serbian Progressive Party politicians
21st-century Serbian historians